Nisko is a railway station in Nisko, Subcarpathian Voivodeship, Poland. In addition to the station building and the platform, there is a 400-meter-long goods ramp at the station.

History 
Until the end of the 1990s, the station had a single-track siding to a sawmill and a military unit with a passing loop located between 1000-lecia and Sandomierska Streets. The remains of the track can now be found near the buildings of the former sawmill. Despite the electrification of the lines in 1989, shaped semaphores are still used at the station. In 2017, the station served 50-99 passengers a day.

Domestic train services 
The station offers connections to Lublin, Rzeszów, Stalowa Wola, Szczecin, Warsaw and Wrocław.

References

Railway stations in Podkarpackie Voivodeship
Nisko County